Mr Gay World 2011, the 3rd Mr Gay World pageant, was held at the Club MWAH, in Manila, Philippines on March 13, 2011. Charl Van Den Berg of South Africa crowned his successor, fellow South African, François Nel. 26 countries and territories were competed for the title.

Results

Special awards

Judges
Karen Loren Agustin - Binibining Pilipinas - Universe 2002
Eric Butter - President of Mr. Gay World Ltd.
Andrew Craig - Founding Editor DNA Magazine.
Gloria Diaz - Miss Universe 1969
Jorgen Landby - Freelance Make Up Artist
Remco Teppema - Co-founder/co-publisher of the gay publications Winq and Mate Magazine
Charl Van Den Berg - Mr Gay World 2010.

Contestants

National pageant notes

Returning country
Last competed in 2009:

Withdrawals

Did not attend

External links
Official Site
Official Sponsor of Mr.Gay World 2011 - The Coverage Article - Gallery

2011
2011 beauty pageants
2011 in LGBT history
2011 in the Philippines
March 2011 events in the Philippines
21st century in Manila